Peoria Accelerated High School is a public charter high school in Peoria, Arizona. It is operated by The Leona Group.

References

Public high schools in Arizona
The Leona Group
Charter schools in Arizona
Schools in Maricopa County, Arizona